The Maule Sur football teamis a football team representing the south of the Maule Region in Chile. The stated mission of the team is "to represent the territory of Maule Sur, its culture, identity and history in a local, national and international level". Maule Sur is a member of ConIFA].

History

In 2022, Maule Sur appointed Jaime Pacheco as manager. Maule Sur won the 2022 CONIFA South America Football Cup, the first-ever CONIFA South America Football Cup. Maule Sur will participate in the 2024 CONIFA World Football Cup.

Competitive record

ConIFA South America Football Cup record

References

CONIFA member associations
Football teams in Argentina
Maule Region